Bud Lilly (1925-2017) was the owner of the "Trout Shop" in Montana as well as an accomplished baseball player and fly fishing guide.

Early life and education
Walen Francis “Bud” Lilly II was born on August 13, 1925, in Manhattan, Montana. to Violet Collins, a hotelier, and Walen Lilly, a barber. Bud graduated from Manhattan High School in 1942. Following the time that he spent in the military, he enrolled in Montana State University in Bozeman in 1946 and earned a bachelor's degree in applied science. In 1951, Lilly earned his master's degree in education from the University of Montana in Missoula. He then became a public school math and science teacher in Bozeman and Deer Lodge until his retirement in 1970. He briefly also worked as a teacher in Scottsdale, Arizona

Involvement in baseball
Bud's father Bud Sr. was a great fan of baseball, and he taught Bud to play. At age five, Bud received his first bat and glove, and he began playing in sandlot games. At age twelve, Bud began playing organized baseball. and played in both American Legion and town-team baseball  He rapidly gained more experience. At fourteen, he became the youngest player on the Gallatin Valley Men's Team, an independent baseball team whose players ranged in age from fourteen to fifty. Bud played second base

While in the Gallatin Valley Men's Team, Lilly played in an exhibition game against “a Negro League traveling team”. including Satchel Paige, a pitcher who was later inducted into the Baseball Hall of Fame and became the oldest rookie in Major League baseball. Lilly managed to get a hit on a pitch from the famed player and make it to first base, although he was out when he attempted to steal second

In 1940, two men from the Cincinnati Reds scouted the team. Although this moment was not Bud's big break, he took the two men fishing and impressed them with his skills. In 1942, the men returned to watch Bud play again. They offered him a minor-league contract. to play with the Cincinnati Reds farm team, the Salt Lake City Bees. Instead, with World War II ravaging the country, Bud joined the military

Military career
In 1942, Lilly joined the U.S. Armed Forces and travelled to Butte, Montana to train in the V-12 program for U.S. Navy Officers. After two years in the program, Lilly received his commission and “reported to St. John’s Cathedral in New York”. He then journeyed to Bainbridge, MD to go through Navy boot camp.

Lilly trained in Miami from May–July 1945 on destroyers, sub-chasers, and PT boats. Following this training, he shipped out to Italy on the way to invade Japan with the U.S. Forces. During his service, Bud Lilly was assigned to the USS General R.M. Blatchford. He visited Hiroshima, Japan after its bombing by U.S. forces. In 1946, Lilly left the military and returned to Montana to continue his education.

Fly fishing and "The Trout Shop"
During his time as a public school teacher, Lilly began working another job in West Yellowstone and washed cars for extra cash.

In 1961, Lilly purchased a “trout fishing tackle store” in West Yellowstone that became a great success. The shop gathered information about local fishing conditions, provided a space for fishermen to congregate and spend time with one another, and offered fly fishing services and items like tackle and flies.

Lilly also sent out promotional literature and catalogues for fly-fishing as well as teaching fly-fishing lessons. He became a guide on the Madison, Gallatin, and Yellowstone rivers. Some of his clients included Tom Brokaw, Jimmy Carter, and British Ambassador Sir Peter Ramsbotham. He also advocated for catch-and-release and created a club at his shop to encourage the practice in Montana that gave fishermen silver buttons for releasing trout of various lengths. In addition, he supported women's involvement in fly fishing by offering “women-only fishing trips” and assisting in creating “women’s fly-fishing clubs”

The shop also published several editions of a merchandising catalogue and a fishing map of the area in tandem with California businessman David Bascomb. When Lilly's first wife, Patricia, grew ill in 1981, Lilly decided to sell the shop in 1982, although the shop still bore his name during the tenure of the next few owners

Personal life
Bud Lilly married Patricia Bennett on March 15, 1947. The couple had three children: Gregory, Michael, and Annette. After Patricia died in 1984 of lung cancer, Lilly then married Esther Simon. The couple had two children: Christopher and Alisa.

Work in conservation
Bud Lilly also had an active career in conservation work. He was a director of the Greater Yellowstone Coalition, a director of the Whirling Disease Foundation, a director-at-large for the American Wildlands, a board member of the Montana Land Resilience, a member of the National Federation of Fly Fishers, and a member of the Greater Yellowstone Coalition. He has also worked with Trout Unlimited, which he helped found, since its inception in 1962. Lilly also served as the organization's first president.

Following his work with the Trout Shop, Lilly continued his activism in conservation. Lilly's main causes were protecting trout and restoring waterways through preventing overgrazing and extensive logging near headwaters and major bodies of water. He also worked to modify standard practices concerning stocking of hatchery fish and campaigned for increasing wild trout populations in Montana. He was also “credited as one of the pioneers of the catch-and-release movement”, which he began in the 1950s, “long before it became the norm”

Awards and recognition
Lilly received an honorary doctorate from Montana State University. He was also inducted into the Federation of Fly Fishers Hall of Fame and awarded the Heritage award for lifetime achievement from the American Museum of Fly Fishing Bud also helped assemble the almost 10,000-volume "collection of books, manuscripts and personal papers at Montana State University" known as the Bud Lilly Trout and Salmonid Initiative.

Later years
After his mother's death in 1994, Lilly remodelled “The Angler’s Retreat,” a lodge in Three Forks, Montana, to create an eighteen-room retreat for fly fishers in Montana. He also founded the Western Rivers Club, an organization he created to “keep his former customers in touch”. Lilly volunteered as a Montana Ambassador, a state-sponsored program to encourage tourism and recreation in the state, and worked as a river keeper for Baker Springs, a land development company near his hometown of Manhattan, Montana.

In his later years, Lilly's vision deteriorated due to macular degeneration, but he continued to fish frequently with friends. He also founded the Warriors and Quiet Waters Foundation, which “brings disabled vets to Montana to introduce them to fly fishing and the therapeutic power of ever-flowing waters”. Bud Lilly died in Bozeman, Montana on January 4, 2017 from heart failure at the age of 91.

Publications
 Lilly, Bud., and Paul. Schullery. A Trout's Best Friend : The Angling Autobiography of Bud Lilly. 1st ed. Boulder, Colo.: Pruett, 1988.
 Lilly, Bud., and Paul. Schullery. Bud Lilly's Guide to Fly Fishing the New West. Portland, OR: Frank Amato Publications, 2000.
 Lilly, Bud., and Paul. Schullery. Bud Lilly's Guide to Western Fly Fishing. Deluxe ed. New York, NY: Nick Lyons Books, 1987.
 Bud Lilly's Trout Shop. Bud Lilly's Trout Shop : Fly Fishing Catalogue., 1980.
 Bud Lilly's Trout Shop. Bud Lilly's Tackle Catalogue and Handbook for Western Trout Fishing.

References

External links 
 Montana State University Library: Bud Lilly papers, 1926-2008

1925 births
2017 deaths
American fishers
Montana State University alumni
Businesspeople from Montana
20th-century American businesspeople
American military personnel of World War II